Margarella achilles is a species of sea snail, a marine gastropod mollusk in the family Calliostomatidae.

Description
The shell grows to a height of 19 mm.

Distribution
This subantarctic marine species is found off South Georgia at depths between 0 m and 53 m.

References

External links
 To Antarctic Invertebrates
 To Encyclopedia of Life
 To USNM Invertebrate Zoology Mollusca Collection
 To World Register of Marine Species

achilles
Gastropods described in 1908